Sean Alexander Roberts (21 December 1968 – 27 March 2017) was a New Zealand cricketer. He played one first-class match for Auckland in 1994/95.

See also
 List of Auckland representative cricketers

References

External links
 

1968 births
2017 deaths
New Zealand cricketers
Auckland cricketers
Cricketers from Napier, New Zealand